CSRP2 binding protein is a protein that in humans is encoded by the CSRP2BP gene.

CSRP2 is a protein containing two LIM domains, which are double zinc finger motifs found in proteins of diverse function. CSRP2 and some related proteins are thought to act as protein adapters, bridging two or more proteins to form a larger protein complex. The protein encoded by this gene binds to one of the LIM domains of CSRP2 and contains an acetyltransferase domain. Although the encoded protein has been detected in the cytoplasm, it is predominantly a nuclear protein. Alternatively spliced transcript variants have been described.

Model organisms
		
Model organisms have been used in the study of CSRP2BP function. A conditional knockout mouse line, called Csrp2bptm1a(KOMP)Wtsi was generated as part of the International Knockout Mouse Consortium program — a high-throughput mutagenesis project to generate and distribute animal models of disease to interested scientists.

Male and female animals underwent a standardized phenotypic screen to determine the effects of deletion.

Twenty seven tests were carried out on mutant mice and eight significant abnormalities were observed. Fewer than expected homozygous mutant embryos were identified during gestation. Fewer also survived until weaning. Male homozygous mutant's eyelids fail to open, they had abnormal eye size, a decreased susceptibility to bacterial infection and a decreased body length.  Female homozygous mutants had a decreased lean body mass. Animals of both sex also had corneal opacity and spinal abnormalities (including scoliosis and fusion of vertebral arches).

References

External links

Further reading 
 

Genes mutated in mice